The 1984–85 Iraqi National Clubs First Division was the 11th season of the competition since its foundation in 1974. For the first time in Iraqi football history, three points were awarded for a win instead of two.

The tournament reached round 21 with several postponed games from previous rounds, and on 23 February 1985, the Iraq Football Association (IFA) officially cancelled the league. This was because the league schedule was conflicting with the national team's World Cup qualifying campaign, which was considered to be the priority. At the time of cancellation, Al-Talaba's Hussein Saeed was the leading scorer with 14 goals.

Name changes
Qiwa Al-Amn Al-Dakhili renamed to Al-Shorta.

League table at abandonment

Results

Season statistics

Hat-tricks

References

External links
 Iraq Football Association

Iraqi Premier League seasons
1984–85 in Iraqi football
Iraq